Forest River Inc. is an American manufacturer of recreational vehicles, cargo trailers, utility trailers, pontoon boats, and buses.

History
Forest River, Inc., (Forest River) was founded in 1996 by Peter Liegl and the company just recently celebrated its 20th anniversary.

After Purchasing Certain assets of Cobra Industries in January 1996 where CEO Peter Liegl served from 1985 to 1993.
The company started by manufacturing tentcampers, travel trailers, fifth wheels, and park models under the following model lines: Salem, Sierra, Sandpiper, Wildwood, Rockwood, Flagstaff, Summit, and Quailridge. Later that same year, they began producing cargo utility trailers as Cargo Mate.

Forest River has grown through growth and acquisitions.

In 1997, Forest River established a second cargo trailer line in 1997 called Continental Cargo.

In 1998, Forest River Launched Forest River Marine and began producing pontoon boats. That same year the company purchased certain assets of Firan Motorhomes to begin manufacturing Class A Motorhomes.

In 2000, Forest River acquired US Cargo, another manufacturer of utility trailers.

In 2001, Forest River entered the bus business through the acquisitions of Starcraft Bus and Glaval Bus.

In 2002, Rockport Commercial Vehicles, a brand of commercial vehicles and cargo trucks, was launched. That same year, the company acquired Vanguard Industries and the assets of Palomino.

With its rapidly expanding business, Forest River moved its corporate office out of the original building in Goshen, Indiana, to its current location in Elkhart, Indiana. Each new acquisition and launch led to expansions in manufacturing and production facilities.

In 2005, Forest River, Inc., was acquired by Warren Buffett and Berkshire Hathaway, Inc. In the same year, a new luxury coach brand, Elkhart Coach was launched.

Forest River continued to expand with the acquisition of Rance Aluminum Fabrication and Priority One Financial Services in 2007.

The following year, the company acquired assets of Coachmen RV, a subsidiary of Coachmen Industries. Coachmen provides a broad breadth of product makes, ranging from rear diesel motorhomes, gas class A motorhomes, class C motorhomes, travel trailers, fifth wheels, tent campers and sport utility trailers and have been on North American roads dating back to 1964.

Prime Time Manufacturing, which builds towable recreational vehicles, was established in 2009 followed by the revival of the Shasta product line in 2010, one of the intellectual properties of the Coachmen asset acquisition.

In 2011, Forest River acquired Dynamax Corporation, which builds Luxury motorhomes (Super Class C and Class C).

In 2014, the company expanded further with the addition of production facilities in Silverton, Oregon, Hemet, California, and White Pigeon, Michigan. That same year, the company acquired StarTrans Bus.

In 2016, Forest River Marine added the Trifecta Pontoon line.

In January 2017, Forest River launched its new line of luxury buses, Berkshire Coach. In June of the same year, Battisti Customs was acquired.

In May 2020, Forest River acquired the following REV Group shuttle bus brands: Champion, Federal Coach, World Trans, Krystal Coach, ElDorado, and Goshen Coach.

Purchase by Berkshire Hathaway
On June 21, 2005, Warren Buffett received a two-page fax telling him   why Forest River met the  Berkshire Hathaway’s acquisition criteria. Buffett immediately asked for more figures,  and that afternoon he made Pete Liegl an offer.  On June 28, 2005, they agreed on a deal.  The transaction closed on August 31, 2005.

Forest River Owners’ Group
Formed in 2011, the Forest River Owners’ Group (FROG), is a community of recreational vehicle owners from all over the US and Canada. Free to owners of Forest River and affiliated brands’  products, it organizes group trips and rallies. These vary in size from small local gatherings to the annual FROG International Rally in Goshen, Indiana. In 2015, the FROG International Rally had approximately 700 RVs and 1400 members.

Subsidiaries
Forest River, Inc., though known best for its recreational vehicles, sells a wide variety of products including cargo trailers, buses, and pontoon boats. Below are the subsidiary brands of Forest River, Inc.:

Buses
Berkshire Coach
Glaval Bus
Elkhart Coach
Starcraft Bus
StarTrans Bus
Battisti Customs
ElDorado Motor Corp.
Champion Bus

Cargo Trailers
Force Trailers
Restroom Trailers
AmeraLite
Cargo Mate
Continental Cargo
Haulin Trailers
Lightning Trailers
Rance Aluminum Trailers
US Cargo

Commercial Trucks
Rockport Commercial Vehicles

Park Models
Cabins and Suites
Summit
Quailridge

Pontoon Boats
Berkshire Pontoons
South Bay Pontoons
Trifecta Pontoons

References 

Berkshire Hathaway
Recreational vehicle manufacturers
Vehicle manufacturing companies established in 1996
Manufacturing companies based in Indiana
Motor vehicle manufacturers based in Indiana
1996 establishments in Indiana
Companies based in Elkhart County, Indiana
2005 mergers and acquisitions